Mauro Sérgio Viriato Mendes or simply Maurinho (born October 11, 1978, in Fernandópolis), is a Brazilian former professional football right back.

Honours

Club
Brazilian League (3rd division): 2001
Brazilian League: 2002, 2003, 2006
Minas Gerais State League: 2003, 2004
Brazilian Cup: 2003

Individual
Brazilian Bola de Prata (Placar): 2003

External links
 CBF
 sambafoot
 Guardian Stats Centre
 zerozero.pt

1978 births
Living people
Brazilian footballers
Campeonato Brasileiro Série A players
Ituano FC players
Esporte Clube São Bento players
Sertãozinho Futebol Clube players
Paulista Futebol Clube players
Santos FC players
Cruzeiro Esporte Clube players
São Paulo FC players
Goiás Esporte Clube players
Grêmio Barueri Futebol players
Goncalves, Gilberto Ribeiro
Association football fullbacks
Association football wingers
People from Fernandópolis
Brazil international footballers
Footballers from São Paulo (state)